The 2021–22 Alabama Crimson Tide women's basketball team represents the University of Alabama during the 2021–22 NCAA Division I women's basketball season. The Crimson Tide, led by ninth-year head coach Kristy Curry, plays their home games at Coleman Coliseum and compete as members of the Southeastern Conference (SEC).

Previous season
The Crimson Tide finished the season 17–10 (8–8 SEC) to finish in seventh place in the conference. They received an at-large bid to the 2021 NCAA Division I women's basketball tournament, where they advanced to the Second Round, defeating North Carolina in the First Round before falling to Maryland.

Offseason

Departures

2021 recruiting class

Incoming transfers

Roster

Schedule

|-
!colspan=9 style=| Exhibition

|-
!colspan=9 style=| Non-conference regular season

|-
!colspan=9 style=| SEC regular season

|-
!colspan=9 style=| SEC Tournament

|-
!colspan=9 style=| WNIT

See also
2021–22 Alabama Crimson Tide men's basketball team

References

Alabama Crimson Tide women's basketball seasons
Alabama
Alabama Crimson Tide
Alabama Crimson Tide
Alabama